Alberto Ruiz Benito (born 22 December 1961 in Barcelona) is a retired Spanish pole vaulter.

His personal best jump was 5.61 metres, achieved in June 1986 in Manresa.

International competitions

References

External links
 
 
 

1961 births
Living people
Spanish male pole vaulters
Olympic athletes of Spain
Athletes (track and field) at the 1984 Summer Olympics
Athletes (track and field) at the 1992 Summer Olympics
Mediterranean Games competitors for Spain
Athletes (track and field) at the 1983 Mediterranean Games
Athletes from Catalonia
Athletes from Barcelona